Sakurairo may refer to:
 Sakurairo (Angela Aki song)
 Sakurairo (Shiori Takei song)
 Sakurairo (The color of a cherry blossom = Pink)